The 1874 South Devonshire by-election was fought on 19 March 1874.  The byelection was fought due to the incumbent Conservative MP, Sir Massey Lopes, becoming Civil Lord of the Admiralty.  It was retained by the incumbent.

References

1874 elections in the United Kingdom
1874 in England
19th century in Devon
March 1874 events
By-elections to the Parliament of the United Kingdom in Devon constituencies
Unopposed ministerial by-elections to the Parliament of the United Kingdom in English constituencies